Provanna buccinoides is a species of sea snail, a marine gastropod mollusk in the family Provannidae.

References

  Warén A. & Bouchet P. (2001). Gastropoda and Monoplacophora from hydrothermal vents and seeps new taxa and records. The Veliger 44(2): 116–231

buccinoides
Gastropods described in 1993